= Significant Landscape Overlays =

Significant Landscape Overlays or SLOs are one type of Overlay provided by the Victoria Planning Provisions.

== Background ==
Significant Landscape Overlays are used as part of constructing Planning Schemes by each local government in Victoria, Australia. In combination with Zones which control land usage, Overlays are designed to control land development. Other Overlays include Heritage Overlays (HOs), Design and Development Overlays (DDOs), Neighbourhood Character Overlays (NCOs), Land Subject to Inundation Overlays (LSIOs), Special Building Overlays (SBOs), Public Acquisition Overlays (PAOs), Environmental Audit Overlays (EAOs) and Vegetation Protection Overlays (VPOs). Every Planning Scheme provides maps that locate areas affected by each type of Overlay.

== Conservation ==
The Significant Landscape Overlay is used to both determine landscapes of significance at the municipal level as well as to conserve and control the kind of development that occurs within those landscapes. Landscapes may be deemed significant for a combination of historic, aesthetic, scientific, religious and social reasons - where vegetation is deemed integral to the amenity of the area.

Schedules to Overlays set out specific requirements to be met in particular locations within a municipality. Each Schedule to a Significant Landscape Overlay contains:

- a Statement of nature and key elements of landscape
- Landscape character objective to be achieved
- Permit requirements
- Decision guidelines
- Reference documents

Within areas covered by the Significant Landscape Overlay, planning permits are required to:

- remove or trim a protected tree
- undertake building works within four metres of protected trees
- erect new buildings or extend existing buildings
- construct a fence

A protected tree is identified as any that has a circumference of fifty centimetres or greater at one metre above ground-level. Each Overlay provides a Table of Exemptions for the removal or trimming of protected trees to the minimum necessary extent possible.

Significant Landscape Overlays also set limits as to the percentage of land which may be built upon, minimum set-backs from the property boundaries and maximum building heights.

Residents can apply to their local government to have Zones and Overlays on their land changed. Changes are not usually made to individual properties but to areas of land. Changes may also be made as a result of changes to Local Planning Policy.
